The 1998 Croatia Open Umag was a men's tennis tournament played on outdoor clay courts in Umag, Croatia that was part of the World Series of the 1998 ATP Tour. It was the ninth edition of the tournament and was held from 27 July until 2 August 1998. Seventh-seeded Bohdan Ulihrach won the singles title.

Finals

Singles

 Bohdan Ulihrach defeated  Magnus Norman, 6–3, 7–6(7–0)
 It was Ulihrach's only title of the year and the 3rd of his career.

Doubles

 Neil Broad /  Piet Norval defeated  Jiří Novák /  David Rikl, 6–1, 3–6, 6–3
 It was Broad's 1st title of the year and the 6th of his career. It was Norval's only title of the year and the 8th of his career.

See also
 1998 Croatian Bol Ladies Open

References

External links
 ITF tournament edition details

Croatia Open Umag
Croatia Open
1998 in Croatian tennis